The East Coastway line is a railway line along the south coast of Sussex to the east of Brighton, England. Trains to the west of Brighton operate on the West Coastway line. Together with the West Coastway and the Marshlink line to the east, the line forms part of a continuous route from Havant to Ashford.

The train operating company Southern refers to the routes on this line as "East Coastway" or "Coastway East".  The trains running under the East Coastway name serve stations between Brighton, Lewes, Eastbourne, Hastings, Ore and Ashford, together with the branch line to Seaford. A closed branch to Kemptown, Brighton diverged just east of London Road Station.

Route

Brighton to Lewes (East Branch)

From Brighton, trains using the East Coastway line use mostly the eastern platforms, travel along the Brighton Main Line before turning east over the 28 arch London Road viaduct giving views of the housing in Preston and Withdean in the north and the city to the south, before heading into a cutting where London Road (Brighton) is situated. The line climbs on a 1 in 258 gradient, through the first tunnel, Ditchling Road Tunnel, 63 yd (58m) in length. Shortly afterwards lay the junction for the Kemp Town branch, closed in 1971. Continuing the climb the route passes , opened 12 May 1980. Crossing Hodshrove Viaduct the gradient starts to increase to 1 in 99 reaching  on a 1 in 93 gradient, then levelling out in Falmer Tunnel, 490yd (441m).

Keymer Junction to Lewes

The line speed along this section of the line reaches 90 mph still descending towards Cooksbridge slowing to 70 mph and passing Hamsey level crossing and turning south to run near the River Ouse and entering Lewes Tunnel, 395 yards and into .

Lewes to Eastbourne

Both leaving Lewes via the Wealden Line, splitting at Culver Junction. Leaving Lewes, the main line and the east branch converge and then sweep around a long curve over the River Ouse and under the A27 road to Southerham Junction for the Newhaven & Seaford branch. At one time, to the north side of the line lay interchange sidings for the then near-by cement works.

A mile further the route passes under the A27 road again at the base of Mount Caburn then passing Glynde which once had interchange sidings for two industrial branch lines; one to a clay pit and the other to a chalk pit. The line follows a near straight route to Berwick, then heading on a slight undulating gradient over the River Cuckmere and then downhill towards the current Polegate station the previous station, 330 yards west, was once a busy junction station with the former branch line to  via  (Cuckoo Line) which closed in 1968. The East Coastway line then continued west towards Hastings avoiding Eastbourne and a branch line heading southwest for Eastbourne. The direct line to Hastings is now closed, and all trains run into  and reverse to continue their journey. After a sharp bend the route follows a slight downhill gradient to Willingdon Junction, where the route to and from Hastings now runs.

Eastbourne to St Leonards

From Eastbourne the route is reversed through Hampden Park to Willingdon Junction where the route turns  to the former Stone Cross Junction, where the route from Polegate once joined. Then a slight gradient to  where the line now passes Pevensey Castle crosses the Pevensey Levels through the lesser served , opened in 1905 as a halt and is now only served at peak times. Passing the Beachlands estate on the south and a caravan site the line passes through Normans Bay; this station was originally opened as a halt and still maintains an hourly service. The route next runs through a cutting to the site of Galley Hill sidings and then running along the coast past Bulverhythe and the depots of the Hastings Diesels and the Southeastern and going through the site of St Leonards (West Marina), closed 1967.
Some trains from London and Brighton continue beyond Hastings to  where there is a turnaround siding, the old depot having been closed and re-developed. This is the end of the East Coastway route. The line heading east to Ashford is the Marshlink line.

History

Main line
The Brighton, Lewes and Hastings Railway (BLHR) was formed on 7 February 1844 and received Parliamentary approval for the construction of a line between Brighton and Lewes on 29 July 1844. This section opened on 8 June 1846.

On 27 July 1846 the BLHR, along with other railways, merged to form the London, Brighton and South Coast Railway. In November 1846 the bridge over the River Asten was completed and Bulverhythe station was replaced with Hastings and St Leonards station, later renamed St Leonards West Marina station.

For almost a year all services from London travelled via Brighton until a spur off the Brighton Main Line was constructed from Keymer Junction to Lewes and opened on 2 October 1847. On 14 May 1849, two branches from Polegate opened, one southwards to Eastbourne and one northwards to Hailsham making Polegate an important junction.

The first station at Lewes was a terminus at Friar's Walk. After the extension to Hastings opened, through trains from Brighton visited the station then reversed out before continuing east. When the line from Haymer Junction opened on 1 October 1847, a new set of makeshift and unroofed platforms opened near the junction to the station, known as the Pinwell platforms. These eliminated the need for reversing trains but were separate from Friars walk. A new junction station with four platform was constructed and opened on 1 November 1857, serving Brighton, London, Uckfield, Newhaven Eastbourne and Hastings. To accommodate more platforms and reduce the tight curves, the station was rebuilt and realigned, and reopened on 17 June 1889. The original route leading to the freight yards was retained.

Eastbourne station was originally a timber building. It was rebuilt in 1866; the timber was reused to build a house at No. 1 Wharf Road. The second station was redesigned in 1872 and then significantly rebuilt in 1886. At its peak it had four platforms, a locomotive shed and an extensive goods yard. A branch line was also built just north of the station heading east to the town's gasworks and to the "Crumbles", an area of shingle which was once used for ballast on the railway line. The junction north of Hampden Park is called Willingdon Junction, where the route diverges either east or west.

A single line spur from Willingdon Junction to Stone Cross Junction was opened on 2 August 1871, forming a triangular junction between Polegate,  and Eastbourne and allowing direct trains to operate from Eastbourne to Hastings. This was doubled in 1862.

The remaining  of line to Hastings were constructed by the South Eastern Railway in 1851 as a part of their line from Ashford to Hastings but the London, Brighton and South Coast Railway – obtained running powers over it.

Kemp Town branch

A  branch line from east of London Road station to  opened on 2 August 1869. It was expensive to build and required a tunnel and a 14 arch viaduct across Lewes Road and Hartington Road. The line was primarily constructed to alleviate the LBSCR's fears of another company approaching Brighton from the east. An intermediate station at  opened on 1 September 1873.

The branch temporarily closed to passengers on 1 January 1917. It reopened on 10 August 1919 but closed permanently on 1 January 1933. During the Second World War, the tunnel leading into Kemp Town was used as an air-raid shelter. The line continued to be used for goods traffic until 14 August 1971. The viaduct was demolished in 1976.

Crumbles branch
This  branch, constructed in 1862, led to a  shingle bank known locally as The Crumbles. The LB&SCR used the shingle as ballast for its railway lines. Ballast trains ran until 1932 when the Southern Railway favoured granite. Other branches appeared on the line; a siding was built in 1870 when the Eastbourne Gas Company built their works which straddled the line. Coal was transported to the gasworks. In return it produced coke and was taken away and in 1926 a line was created for the Eastbourne Corporation Electric Works to transport coal, also supplying fuel to the bus garage and taking scrap metal away from the refuse destructor works. The branch saw its last steam engines in April 1960 and diesel shunting locomotives were provided for the work until the line closed in early 1967.

Motor trains
All apart from Stone Cross (closed 1935) and Glyne Gap (closed 1915) remain open.

Electrification
All the lines, as far as Ore (except the Kemp Town branch line), were electrified using the (750 V DC third rail) system by the Southern Railway, opening in May 1935.

World War II
Because of the line's proximity to the East Sussex Coast it was the target of a number of bombing raids during the World War II. During a daylight air raid on 25 May 1943 a German bomber dropped five bombs that hit the upper goods yard north of Brighton station and part of the London Road viaduct carrying the East Coastway line, along with other damage the bombs demolished two arches of the viaduct and killed one railway employee. Temporary repairs to the viaduct were soon made and by the year's end the damaged brickwork was restored.

In March 1944 the station platforms at Eastbourne were badly damaged during a German air raid, ripping up track and bringing down platform canopies. In 1942, railway employees were killed during an ARP exercise.

Operation

Services

Passenger services are operated by Southern. Between  and St Leonards West Marina the track is shared with Southeastern using their services on the Hastings Line and also shunting movements to the depot at St Leonards West Marina.

A typical Southern service along the route is:
 Hourly, London Victoria – Eastbourne
 Hourly, London Victoria – Ore via Eastbourne
 Hourly, Eastbourne – Ashford International
 Hourly, Brighton – Hastings via Eastbourne
 Hourly, Brighton – Ore via Eastbourne
 Half hourly, Brighton – Seaford
 Half hourly, Brighton – Lewes

In circumstances when the Brighton Main Line has both running lines closed between Preston Park and Keymer Junction, some services between Brighton and London may be diverted via Lewes, with trains having to reverse at the end of the station.

A Southeastern service is typically a half hourly London Charing Cross–Hastings.

Signalling

Pre 2015
The line was originally signalled by a mixture of semaphore signals and colour lights by several signal boxes over the years. Almost every station had a signal box, Lewes even had five signal boxes controlling the area including the goods yard. Polegate had three signal boxes and other signal boxes at Willingdon and Stone Cross junctions and at Pevensey Bay and Cooden Beach There were also crossing boxes at Ripe, between Glynde and Berwick, and at Wilmington, between Berwick and Polegate.

Before 2015, Three Bridges signalling centre controlled the route between Keymer Junction and Plumpton and Brighton to Falmer where Lewes Power Box takes over until Southerham Junction, from which absolute block signalling takes over through to Hastings. Signal boxes were situated at Berwick, Polegate Crossing, Hampden Park, Eastbourne, Pevensey and Westham, Bexhill and Bo-Peep Junction. There were two crossing boxes at Plumpton and Normans Bay.

2015 Re-signalling
In 2013 a project by Network Rail drew plans to upgrade the route between Lewes and St Leonards to replace the semaphore signals and signal boxes to colour light signals which will be controlled from a new Railway Operations Centre at Three Bridges.
On  Friday 13 February 2015, Berwick, Polegate, Hampden Park, Eastbourne, Pevensey and Westham, Normans Bay and Bexhill signal boxes signalled their last trains and over the weekend, the semaphore signals and current colour light signalling was replaced and new colour light signals installed and tested. The line reopened on Monday 16 February 2015 with Hampden Park Signal Box being demolished over the weekend. Bexhill, Eastbourne and Berwick signal boxes are listed buildings and were saved from demolition, and Polegate signal box was bought by the local town council to serve as a museum. Pevensey Signal box is due for demolition at a later date.

Accidents

 Eastbourne station rail crash – 25 August 1958; 5 killed, 40 injured.
 Bo-Peep Junction accident – 23 June 1861; 10 injured
 Falmer station accident – 6 June 1851; 5 killed.

Gallery

References
Citations

Sources

External links

Southern trains network routes

Rail transport in East Sussex
Transport in Brighton and Hove
Railway lines opened in 1846
Railway lines in South East England
Standard gauge railways in England
1846 establishments in England